Adam Drummond (31 January 1713 – 17 June 1786), 11th of Lennoch and 4th of Megginch in Perthshire, was a Scottish merchant, banker and politician who sat in the House of Commons between 1761 and 1786.

Life

Drummond was the eldest son of John Drummond. He was educated at Leiden University, and after briefly studying law joined the army in 1739, being commissioned as lieutenant in the 47th Regiment of Foot in 1741 and promoted to captain in 1745. In this capacity he served against the Jacobite rising at the Battle of Prestonpans, where he was captured. While being held prisoner in Edinburgh, 400 guineas was smuggled to him by Colin Simpson, apprentice to his uncle Adam Drummond, a surgeon-apothecary in Edinburgh. He later served in North America, but was put on half-pay in 1753 and retired from the army in 1756 and set up as a merchant.

On 4 February 1755, Drummond married Catherine Ashe, widow of William Ashe, MP and daughter of the 4th Duke of Bolton. The Bolton family controlled a number of pocket boroughs, and at the next general election (in 1761) Drummond entered Parliament as Member of Parliament for Lymington. Although the Duke of Bolton went into opposition after the election, Drummond supported the government, and in 1764 was rewarded when in partnership with Sir Samuel Fludyer he was awarded the lucrative contract for victualling the British troops in North America. Later the same year, Drummond, Fludyer and Anthony Bacon secured a 30-year lease of all the coal on Cape Breton Island and in 1767 he acquired a large land grant in St John's Island (now Prince Edward Island). Further profitable contracts followed and, unlike his partner Fludyer, Drummond was able to retain or renew them as governments changed by remaining loyal to whichever administration was in power and helped by the influence of his noble brother-in-law.

Drummond was a partner in the Ayr Bank, which crashed disastrously in 1772, but his fortune survived. In 1775 Thomas Coutts took him into partnership, despite misgivings at his having been involved in the Ayr Bank collapse, but eventually had second thoughts and asked him to resign the partnership in 1780.

He died in 1786. He is buried with his wife, the Lady Catherine Powlett, in Greyfriars Kirkyard in Edinburgh close to the eastern path.

His heir was his nephew, John Drummond, who also succeeded him as MP for Shaftesbury.

References

 Robert Beatson, A Chronological Register of Both Houses of Parliament (London: Longman, Hurst, Res & Orme, 1807) 

1713 births
1786 deaths
Leiden University alumni
Scottish bankers
Members of the Parliament of Great Britain for Scottish constituencies
British Army personnel of the Jacobite rising of 1745
47th Regiment of Foot officers
Members of the Parliament of Great Britain for St Ives
British MPs 1761–1768
British MPs 1768–1774
British MPs 1774–1780
British MPs 1780–1784
British MPs 1784–1790
Burials at Greyfriars Kirkyard